Claude Brian "Stack" Stevens (2 June 1940 – 10 October 2017) was an English rugby union player who played prop for Penzance and Newlyn, Harlequins, Cornwall (with 83 caps, and captain from 1973 to 1975) and England 25 times at international level between 1969 and 1975, captaining them for a match in 1971. He also toured with the British and Irish Lions to Australia and New Zealand in 1971.

Stevens had suffered from a rare and serious neurological condition. He died on 10 October 2017.

References

1940 births
2017 deaths
Cornish rugby union players
British & Irish Lions rugby union players from England
England international rugby union players
Rugby union props
Cornish Pirates players
Harlequin F.C. players